Theo Janssen (born 27 July 1981) is a Dutch former footballer who played as a midfielder for various clubs in the Netherlands, including Vitesse, Twente and Ajax, as well as on loan for Belgian club Genk. He spent 10 years with Vitesse before joining Twente in 2008, where he helped them win the Eredivisie and qualify for the Champions League for the first time in their history. After being named Dutch Footballer of the Year in 2011, he played a season with Ajax, before returning to Vitesse in August 2012.

Club career

Vitesse
Janssen began his career at amateur club Vitesse Arnhem 1892 and played from 1995–96 in the reserves of Vitesse. After breaking through in several youth teams Janssen made his professional debut on 9 December 1998 in the first team against NAC Breda, which Vitesse won 2–0. Janssen came in as substitute in 90th minute to replace Marian Zeman. Janssen played 5 games that season for Vitesse. The next season Janssen made 17 appearances for Vitesse. In the 2000–2001 season Janssen became a starter for Vitesse and made 30 appearances, in which he scored once. In September Janssen broke his shin, he played 10 games total that season, and scored 1 goal.

Genk
For the 2003–04 season Janssen was loaned to Genk in Belgium. He made 15 appearances and scored two goals before returning to Vitesse in January 2004.

Return to Vitesse
Janssen played another 16 games in 2004 in which he scored one goal.

He played primarily on the wing in the following season. His leg operation was sometimes troubling him, nevertheless he made 28 appearances in which he scored 8 goals.

In the 2005–06 season he played 30 games for Vitesse and scored 7 goals. Janssen's good performance at Vitesse was not unseen, as he received an invitation for the Netherlands national football team for a friendly game against Ecuador on 1 March 2006. However, Janssen could not play, due to surgery on his tonsils.

Janssen remained a regular starter for Vitesse in the following season, and was again selected to play for Oranje. This time he was able to play and made his debut for Oranje in a friendly against Ireland. He came in the 83rd minute for Stijn Schaars. On 2 September 2006, Janssen started for Oranje in a European Championship qualifier against Luxembourg. Janssen made only 22 appearances for Vitesse that season, due to injuries and suspensions. Vitesse trainer Aad de Mos told Janssen he could search for another club, despite an existing contract until 2009.

During the 2007–08 season, Janssen once again got injured, this time for several months. He returned playing in late 2007.

Twente

In mid-April 2008 FC Twente announcing the signing Janssen for the upcoming season on a contract until 2012. The transfer fee was approximately worth €1.5 million.

In November 2009 Janssen was suspended by Twente for two months, after a drunk-driving accident. One of his passengers, former professional goalkeeper Kevin Moeliker, ended up in hospital where he was kept in a coma for several days. He lost one of his ears in the accident. Moeliker later recovered, but in 2017 it was revealed that he suffered lasting brain damage from the accident, albeit still being able to function and work. Janssen won the Eredivisie that year with FC Twente.

In the 2010–11 season Janssen had his best season up to that point. He won the Johan Cruijff Schaal and the KNVB Cup with Twente. He scored 20 goals in 46 appearances, which made him club top scorer, among them some important goals for Twente like against Inter Milan, Werder Bremen, Ajax and PSV. He was also voted best player of the Eredivisie of the season 2010–11.

Ajax

On 23 May 2011, Ajax and Twente agreed on a transfer of Janssen to Ajax. The transfer fee was worth €3.2 million. Janssen signed a contract with Ajax for two years and was handed the number 16 shirt, previously worn by Luis Suárez. His first couple of matches for Ajax were not very successful, as coach Frank de Boer decided that Janssen had to play as a defensive midfielder, which was not Janssen's best position. After he was playing in a more attacking position, Janssen became very important in achieving the league victory in 2012.

Second return to Vitesse
Janssen wanted to leave Ajax, after he had heard from Frank de Boer that he would be playing less matches in the coming season. He refused to play a role as substitute. On 27 August 2012, Janssen returned to Vitesse for a fee of approximately €600,000.

End of active football career
After suffering from different injuries of which the latest involved a meniscus operation, Janssen on 4 March 2014 announced that he would immediately end his active football career and that he would pursue a career with Vitesse as a scout for youth players and specialist trainer.

International career
Janssen made his debut for the Netherlands national team against the Republic of Ireland in August 2006.

Career statistics

Club performance

International performance

Honours

Club
FC Twente
 Eredivisie: 2009–10
 KNVB Cup: 2010–11
 Johan Cruijff Schaal: 2010

Ajax
 Eredivisie: 2011–12

Individual
Dutch Footballer of the Year: 2011
Gelders Sportsman of the Year: 2011

References

External links

1981 births
Living people
Footballers from Arnhem
Association football midfielders
Dutch footballers
Netherlands youth international footballers
Netherlands international footballers
SBV Vitesse players
K.R.C. Genk players
FC Twente players
AFC Ajax players
Eredivisie players
Belgian Pro League players
Dutch expatriate footballers
Dutch expatriate sportspeople in Belgium
Expatriate footballers in Belgium
SBV Vitesse non-playing staff